The wedge-tailed sabrewing (Pampa pampa) is a species of hummingbird in the "emeralds", tribe Trochilini of subfamily Trochilinae. It is found in Belize, Guatemala,  Mexico, and possibly Honduras.

Taxonomy and systematics

The taxonomy of the wedge-tailed sabrewing is unsettled. It was formerly placed in the genus Campylopterus. A molecular phylogenetic study published in 2014 found that the genus Campylopterus was polyphyletic. In the revised classification to create monophyletic genera, the wedge-tailed sabrewing was moved to the resurrected genus Pampa by some taxonomic systems.

The International Ornithological Committee (IOC) adopted the split of C. curvipennis into three species of sabrewings, the wedge-tailed (Pampa pampa), curve-winged (P. curvipennis), and long-tailed (P. excellens). It treats each as monotypic. The North American Classification Committee of the American Ornithological Society and the Clements taxonomy adopted long-tailed sabrewing as P. excellens. They adopted the wedge-tailed as P. curvipennis and assigned IOC's wedge-tailed and curve-winged to it as subspecies. BirdLife International's Handbook of the Birds of the World (HBW) was the most conservative. It retained the binomial Campylopterus curvipennis for the wedge-tailed sabrewing with the three taxa as subspecies.

This article follows the IOC treatment of a monotypic wedge-tailed sabrewing.

Description

Their bill is straight, longish, and stout. Adult males have a bright violet crown, metallic green to bronze green upperparts, and bluish green uppertail coverts. Their tail feathers are mostly dull metallic bluish green that becomes purplish black at the ends. The outermost pair have dusky to brownish gray outer webs. Much of their face is dull grayish white to gray, with a white spot behind the eye. Their underparts are brownish gray. Adult females are very similar to the male. However, their crown is dull blue rather than bright violet, their underparts have a pale cinnamon wash, and the tips of the outermost tail feathers have a buff wash. Immature birds are similar to the adult female, with a duller crown whose feathers have buff tips.

Distribution and habitat

The wedge-tailed sabrewing is found in Mexico's Yucatán Peninsula and northeastern Chiapas, Belize, and northern Guatemala. Most sources also include a disjunct population in Honduras in its range. (Note that the map includes the curve-winged sabrewing's separate and more westerly range and excludes Honduras.) It inhabits the interior and edges of humid evergreen and semi-deciduous forest and rainforest.

Behavior

Movement

The wedge-tailed sabrewing is generally a year-round resident but individuals may move to lower elevations after breeding.

Feeding

The wedge-tailed sabrewing's foraging strategy and diet are not known in detail; most of the available information applies to the broader two- or three-subspecies models without separation. It consumes nectar, as do all hummingbirds, and insects like most of them. It forages in the low to middle strata of the forest.

Breeding

As is the case for feeding, most of the wedge-tailed sabrewing's breeding phenology has not been detailed separately from that of the curve-winged and long-tailed. It is believed to nest between March and July. Males display for females at leks.

Vocalization

The available descriptions of the wedge-tailed sabrewing's vocalizations apply to the two- or three-subspecies models. (The xeno-canto recordings are from the monotypic species.) Males sing by themselves or in small groups from bare twigs in the forest understory. The song is "a loud, prolonged, gurgling warble interspersed with squeaky chipping". It is the most complex of any hummingbirds' and is "even comparable with calls of the songbirds." Other vocalizations include "a steady sharp chipping, chip chip chip chip-ip' chip ...and a nasal peek".

Status

The IUCN follows HBW taxonomy and so does not assess the wedge-tailed sabrewing sensu stricto from the three-subspecies Campylopterus curvipennis.

References 

wedge-tailed sabrewing
Birds of Mexico
Birds of the Yucatán Peninsula
Birds of Guatemala
Birds of Belize
Birds of Honduras
Hummingbird species of Central America
wedge-tailed sabrewing
Taxa named by René Lesson
Taxonomy articles created by Polbot
Taxobox binomials not recognized by IUCN